Archibald or Archie Wilson may refer to:

 Archibald Wilson (1921–2014), Rhodesian fighter pilot and politician
 Archie Wilson (Australian footballer) (1888–1961), Australian rules footballer
 Archie Wilson (footballer, born 1890) (1890–1916), English footballer
 Archie F. Wilson (1903–1960), American wood collector
 Archie Wilson (baseball) (1923–2007), baseball player
 Archibald Wilson (Northern Ireland politician) (1945–1956) Member of the Parliament of Northern Ireland for Belfast Windsor 1945–1956
 Sir Archibald Duncan Wilson (1911–1983), British diplomat and Master of Corpus Christi College, Cambridge